University of the Arts London is a collegiate university in London, England, specialising in arts, design, fashion and the performing arts. It is a federation of six arts colleges: Camberwell College of Arts, Central Saint Martins, Chelsea College of Arts, the London College of Communication, the London College of Fashion, and the Wimbledon College of Arts. It was established as a university in 2003, and took its present name in 2004.

History

The university has its origins in seven previously independent art, design, fashion and media colleges, which were brought together for administrative purposes to form the London Institute in 1986. They were: Saint Martin's School of Art; Chelsea School of Art; the London College of Printing; the Central School of Art and Design; Camberwell School of Arts and Crafts; the College for Distributive Trades; and the London College of Fashion. The colleges were originally established between the mid-nineteenth and the early twentieth century.

Under the Education Reform Act of 1988, the London Institute became a single legal entity, and the first court of governors was instated in the following year, 1989. The first appointed rector was John McKenzie. The institute was granted degree-awarding powers in 1993 by the Privy Council. Sir William Stubbs was appointed rector after the retirement of McKenzie in 1996. A coat of arms was granted to the institute in 1998. Will Wyatt was appointed chairman of governors in 1999, and Lord Stevenson of Coddenham was installed as the first chancellor in 2000.

On the retirement of William Stubbs as rector in 2001, Sir Michael Bichard was appointed and encouraged the London Institute to apply for university status. The London Institute originally chose not to apply because its individual colleges were internationally recognised in their own right. In 2003, the London Institute received Privy Council approval for university status; it was renamed University of the Arts London in 2004.

Wimbledon School of Art joined the university as a sixth college in 2006, and was renamed Wimbledon College of Arts. Sir John Tusa was appointed chairman, replacing Will Wyatt, in 2007. Nigel Carrington was appointed rector in 2008, replacing Michael Bichard.

From 2008 to 2010, staff were made redundant and courses closed. At the London College of Communication, where 16 of the 19 courses were discontinued in 2009, staff resigned and students demonstrated and staged a sit-in in protest at the cuts in budget and staff numbers.

Central Saint Martins moved to a purpose-built complex in King's Cross in June 2011.

In 2015 Grayson Perry was appointed to succeed Kwame Kwei-Armah as chancellor of the university.

James Purnell was appointed Vice Chancellor and President, replacing Nigel Carrington from March 2021.

Colleges
The University of the Arts London has six constituent colleges:

Camberwell College of Arts

Camberwell School of Arts and Crafts was established by the Technical Education Board of the London County Council on 10 January 1898, in a building beside the South London Gallery, with the financial support of John Passmore Edwards and following advocacy by Edward Burne-Jones, Lord Leighton, Walter Crane and G. F. Watts. The subjects taught were mainly technical until a Fine Arts department was established between the Wars. The school became part of the London Institute in January 1986, and was renamed Camberwell College of Arts in 1989.

Central Saint Martins

Central Saint Martins College was formed in 1989 by the merger of Saint Martin's School of Art, founded 1854, and the Central School of Art and Design, founded as the Central School of Arts and Crafts in 1896. Drama Centre London, founded in 1963, became part of Central Saint Martins in 1999, and the Byam Shaw School of Art, founded in 1910, was merged into CSM in 2003. The school was renamed Central Saint Martins College of Arts and Design in 2011.

Chelsea College of Arts

The Chelsea School of Art originated as part of the South-Western Polytechnic, which opened in 1895 and in 1922 became the Chelsea Polytechnic. In 1957 the science department of the polytechnic was renamed Chelsea College of Science and Technology; the School of Art became independent from it at that time, and merged with the Regent Street Polytechnic School of Art to create the Chelsea School of Art in 1964. In 1975 Chelsea merged with Hammersmith College of Art and Building, founded in 1891 by Francis Hawke and taken over by the London County Council in 1904. The Chelsea School of Art became part of the London Institute in 1986 and was renamed Chelsea College of Art and Design in 1989.

London College of Communication

The London College of Printing descends from the St Bride's Foundation Institute Printing School, which was established in November 1894 under the City of London Parochial Charities Act of 1883. The Guild and Technical School opened in Clerkenwell in the same year, but moved a year later to Bolt Court, and became the Bolt Court Technical School; it was later renamed the London County Council School of Photoengraving and Lithography. St Bride's came under the control of the London County Council in 1922 and was renamed the London School of Printing and Kindred Trades; in 1949 it was merged with the LCC School of Photoengraving and Lithography, forming the London School of Printing and Graphic Arts. In 1960 this was renamed the London College of Printing. The printing department of the North Western Polytechnic was merged into it in 1969. The London College of Printing became part of the London Institute in 1986.

The Westminster Day Continuation School opened in 1921, and was later renamed the College for Distributive Trades. It became part of the London Institute in 1986. In 1990 it merged with the London College of Printing to form the London College of Printing and Distributive Trades, which in 1996 was renamed the London College of Communication.

London College of Fashion

The London College of Fashion derives from three trade schools for women, the Shoreditch Technical Institute Girls Trade School, founded in 1906, Barrett Street Trade School, founded in 1915, and Clapham Trade School, founded in 1927; all were established by the Technical Education board of the London County Council to train skilled workers for the clothing and hairdressing trades. The Barrett Street school became a technical college after the 1944 Education Act and was renamed Barrett Street Technical College. Shoreditch also became a technical college; in 1955 it merged with Clapham Trade School to form Shoreditch College for the Garment Trades. In 1966 it was renamed Shoreditch College for the Clothing Industry and in 1967 merged with Barrett Street Technical College to become the London College for the Garment Trades, which in 1974 was renamed the London College of Fashion.
It became part of the London Institute in January 1986. In August 2000 it merged with Cordwainers College, founded as the Leather Trade School by the Leathersellers and Cordwainers Company in 1887 in Bethnal Green, and later renamed the Cordwainers Technical College and, in 1991, Cordwainers College.

Wimbledon College of Arts

The foundation of Wimbledon College of Arts goes back to 1890, when an art class for the Rutlish School for Boys was started. Between 1904 and 1920 this was housed in the Wimbledon Technical Institute in Gladstone Road. It became independent in 1930 and moved to Merton Hall Road in 1940. Theatre design was taught from 1932, and became a department in 1948. In 1993 the school, which previously had been controlled by the London Borough of Merton, was incorporated as an independent higher education institution. Wimbledon School of Art became part of University of the Arts London in 2006 and was renamed Wimbledon College of Arts.

Organisation and administration 

The University is a higher education corporation established under Section 121 of the Education Reform Act 1988, and is an exempt charity under charity legislation.

In the financial year to 31 July 2017, the university had a total income (including share of joint ventures) of £281.4 million and total expenditure of £264.0 million. Sources of income included £214,624 million from tuition fees and education contracts, £28,400 million from Funding body grants, £1,439 million from research grants and contracts, £2,718 million from endowment and investment income and £34,227 million from other income.

Rankings, research and recognition 

In 2019 and again in 2021, the university was ranked number 2 for art and design in the QS World University Rankings.

UAL received an overall ranking of 84 out of 124 in the 2019 Complete University Guide league tables, down from 48th place in 2013 and 59th in the 2012 ranking. It scored 56.5 out of 100 for graduate prospects, and 3.94 out of 5 for student satisfaction with teaching.

UAL was ranked 75th in the 2019 Guardian University Guide and 21st out of 67 institutions in the Art subject table.

In the Quality Assurance Agency results in 2004, Camberwell College of Arts and the London College of Communication were awarded 23 out of 24 for art and design; Central Saint Martins College of Art and Design and Chelsea College of Art and Design were awarded 22; London College of Fashion was awarded 21. The OFSTED report in March 2012 gave the University's further education provision an overall rating of "good".

The 2001 Research Assessment Exercise published results by subject area on a point scale from 1, 2, 3a, 3b, 4, 5 to 5*, the University achieved a 5 rating. In 2006–07, this rating equated to a QR grant of £8.6 million. In the 2008 Research Assessment Exercise the Times Higher Educations RAE league tables placed the university 44th out of 132 universities in the institution-wide table.  In the "Art and Design" subject tables it was placed 22nd out of 72 submissions (for "submission A" – the majority of the constituent colleges) and 23rd out of 72 submissions (for "submission B" – Wimbledon College of Art alone).  The university had the largest number of researchers in the arts and design subject area (237.89 full-time equivalent staff); it was followed by Glasgow School of Art with 76.85 equivalent staff. More than half the university's research was rated as "world leading" or "internationally excellent", and 77.5 per cent as internationally significant. An open-access collection of its research outputs, including text and multi-media items, was developed in 2009 by the Kultur project of the Joint Information Systems Committee

A Queen's Anniversary Prize was awarded to Camberwell College of Arts for the conservation of "works of art on paper" in 1996. The prize was also awarded to Central Saint Martins College of Art and Design for its contributions to the British fashion industry, and for nurturing the creativity of students, in 1998.  Cordwainers College of London College of Fashion was awarded the prize for its continued excellence in shoe and accessory design, development and teaching practice in 2008. The University of the Arts London was among the twenty winners of the prize in 2013, for its "industrial and product design".

Central Saint Martins and the London College of Communication have been awarded Skillset Media Academy status, recognising the achievements in the area of media, interactive design and film respectively.

Chelsea College of Arts and the London College of Fashion share the "Creative Learning in Practice Centre for Excellence in Teaching and Learning". The centre is funded by the British government in recognition of the two colleges'  results in developing student learning.

Student life 

The University of the Arts London Students' Union offers various services to students, including running sports clubs and student societies.

The university has 13 halls of residence in various parts of London. It is fourth among United Kingdom institutions by number of international students.

Notes

References

External links

 
1986 establishments in England
Educational institutions established in 1986
Art schools in London
Drama schools in London
Arts
Arts London